AP-238 is an opioid designer drug related to drugs such as azaprocin and bucinnazine, with around the same potency as morphine. It was first discovered in Italy in the 1960s but was never marketed, subsequently appearing on the illicit market around 2020 and being detected in both Slovenia and the USA.

See also 
 2F-Viminol
 Diphenpipenol
 Dipyanone
 Etodesnitazene
 MT-45
 Nortilidine
 O-AMKD
 O-DSMT
 Piperidylthiambutene
 SHR9352

References 

Synthetic opioids
Piperazines
Mu-opioid receptor agonists